The Numbers Game is a reality television infotainment series premiered on April 22, 2013, on National Geographic Channel that explores the numbers and stats in life's major events- birth, death, marriage, money etc. Hosted by data scientist Jake Porway, the show uses data science to unveil hidden numbers through street experiments and interactive game play to guide us to make smart decisions about our destiny.

Episode Lists

References

External links
 Official website
 

National Geographic (American TV channel) original programming
2013 American television series debuts